Liujiang District is under the administration of Liuzhou, Guangxi Zhuang Autonomous Region, China, located on the southwest bank of the Liu River. The southernmost county-level division of Liuzhou City, it lies south of Liuzhou's city proper, bordering the prefecture-level cities of Laibin to the south and Hechi to the northwest.

Administrative divisions
Liucheng consists of 11 towns and 1 township:

Towns:
Labao (拉堡镇), Liyong (里雍镇), Baipeng (百朋镇), Chengyuan (成团镇), Luoman (洛满镇), Liushan (流山镇), Sandu (三都镇), Ligao (里高镇), Jiangde (进德镇), Chuanshan (穿山镇), Shibo (土博镇)

The only township in the Baisha Township (白沙乡)

Transportation

Rail
 Guizhou–Guangxi Railway
 Liuzhou-Wuzhou Railway

Liujiang hominid 
These findings might give some support to the claim that modern humans from Africa arrived at southern China about 100,000 years BP (Zhiren Cave, Chongzuo City: 100,000 years BP; and the Liujiang hominid: controversially dated at 139,000–111,000 years BP ).

Climate

References

External links

County-level divisions of Guangxi
Liuzhou